Shermann Audio is a well-known brand of professional loudspeaker systems manufactured in the UK by the owners of the SHERMANN AUDIO registered trade mark.

Established in 1981 and with its Bournemouth base the Shermann product range was built and distributed from Newtown Mid-Wales until August 2013.

Manufacturing has since been moved near Glasgow where the Shermann brand continually increases in popularity.

References

External links
 http://www.shermann.com

Loudspeaker manufacturers
British brands
Audio equipment manufacturers of the United States